Jake Johnson is an AMA Pro Flat Track Racer from the United States who has competed in the Championship since 2002, winning the Grand National Singles Championship in 2006 and the AMA Pro Grand National Championship in 2010 and 2011.

AMA Pro Flat Track

Write Short AMA History Here

X Games Harley-Davidson Flat-Track

Johnson competed in the 2015 X Games Harley-Davidson Flat-Track, qualifying first in his heat, and finishing 5th behind winner Bryan Smith.

Superprestigio of the Americas

Johnson was invited to participate in the inaugural Superprestigio of the Americas.  He competed in Semifinal 1, but did not proceed to the final.

Career highlights
2002- AMA Flat Track Rookie of the Year   Harley-Davidson XR-750
2006- AMA Grand National Singles Champion    Suzuki RM-Z450
2008- AMA Grand National Singles Champion    Suzuki RM-Z450
2010- AMA Grand National Champion, AMA Flat Track Twins Champion     Zanotti Racing Harley-Davidson XR-750
2011- AMA Grand National Champion   Zanotti Racing  Harley-Davidson XR-750
2012- TKTKT, AMA Grand National Championship     Zanotti Racing Harley-DaviTKdson XR-750
2013- 7th, AMA Grand National Championship    Lloyd Brothers Motorsports Ducati
2014- 3rd, AMA Grand National Championship    Lloyd Brothers Motorsports Kawasaki
2015- 11th, AMA Grand National Championship    Hart Racing Kawasaki Ninja 650R and KX450F

References

External links
   Official Site

1984 births
Living people
American motorcycle racers
AMA Grand National Championship riders
Sportspeople from Camden, New Jersey